or "And yet it moves" is a phrase purportedly uttered by Galileo Galilei.

Eppur si muove may also refer to:
Eppur si muove (EP), a 2006 EP by Enigma
Eppur si muove (television series), an Italian television series
Eppur Si Muove (album), a 2004 album by Haggard
"Eppur Si Muove" (The West Wing), a 2004 episode of The West Wing
"Eppur si muove", a song by Enigma from A Posteriori
Eppur si muove, a fictionalised biography of Károly Kisfaludy by Mór Jókai
Eppur Si Muove, a book by Stefan Marinov
Eppur si muove, a composition for organ by Robert Simpson
Eppur si muove, a composition for flute by Anatol Vieru